is the seventh studio album by Japanese singer songwriter Chihiro Onitsuka. It was released on February 1, 2017 by Victor Entertainment. The album is considered to represent her revival in popularity from her slump.

Limited edition of the album is accompanied with the bonus live compilation album named "Live Best Selection 2016: Tigerlily". It was recorded at the two shows in Tokyo and Osaka during the singer's "Tigerlily" tour.

In Japan, Syndrome debuted at number fifteen on the Oricon weekly albums chart, selling 6,248 copies in its first week. The album has sold over 11,140 copies as of 2018 and became her tenth most successful album.

Promotion

Singles
"Good Bye My Love" was released as the lead single from the album on November 2, 2016. It received widespread acclaim from music critics. Many critics have referred to her revival from her bad vocal condition started from around 2012. The song has peaked at number thirty-five on the Oricon Weekly Singles Chart.

Commercial performance
Syndrome debuted at number fifteen on the Oricon weekly albums chart, selling 6,248 physical copies in its first week. The album has sold over 11,140 physical copies as of 2018 and became her tenth most successful album. Also, the album entered at number twenty on the Billboard Japan Hot Albums chart.

Track listing

Charts

Weekly charts

Release history

References

2017 albums
Victor Entertainment albums
Chihiro Onitsuka albums
Japanese-language albums